Vennanthur or Vennandur is a town panchayat in Vennandur block in Rasipuram taluk of Namakkal district in the state of Tamil Nadu, India.

Geography 
Vennanthur is located at 11.5206° N, 78.0872°E. It has an average elevation of 218 metres (726 ft). Vennandur lake is located west of the town. Vennandur is close to the Alavaimalai Hills, which are part of the Eastern Ghats. The closest river is the Thirumanimutharu River, which rises on Mount Yercaud. Namakkal, the district capital, is located around 39 km from Vennanthur. Chennai, the state capital, is located around 370 km from Vennanthur.

Demographics
Vennanthur is divided into 15 wards,  for which elections are held every 5 years. The Vennanthur Town Panchayat had a population of 14,568 as of the 2011 census, of which 7,427 are males and 7,141 are females, a female sex ratio of 961 against the Tamil Nadu state average of 996. The population of children aged 0–6 was 1328, which was 9.12% of the total population; the child sex ratio was around 884 compared to the state average of 943. The literacy rate was 73.44%, lower than the state average of 80.09%: male literacy was around 81.64% and female literacy 64.99%.

Panchayat villages
There are 24 villages in the panchayat union:

Education 
 Sri Vengateswaraa Polytechnic College
 Sri Vengateswaraa Matriculation Higher Secondary school

References

Cities and towns in Namakkal district
Vennandur block